The Helgeland Bridge is a cable-stayed bridge that crosses the Leirfjorden between the mainland (in Leirfjord Municipality) and the island of Alsta (in Alstahaug Municipality) in Nordland county, Norway.  The town of Sandnessjøen is located just southwest of the bridge on the island.

The Helgeland Bridge was designed by Holger S. Svensson. Construction began in 1989 and it was finished in 1991. The bridge officially opened in July 1991. The bridge was a toll bridge until 23 June 2005.

The bridge is built out of pre-stressed and reinforced concrete and steel cables.

References

Road bridges in Nordland
Bridges completed in 1991
Alstahaug
Leirfjord
Cable-stayed bridges in Norway
Norwegian County Road 17
1991 establishments in Norway
Former toll bridges in Norway